Wang Wufu (born 1948) is a Chinese actor. He won the 11th Golden Phoenix Award, and received the Golden Eagle Award  for Best Actor in 2008.

Works

Television

Film

Awards
 2007 11th Golden Phoenix Award

References

1948 births
Living people
Chinese male film actors
Chinese male television actors